Merritt Clifford "Happy" Buxton (December 14, 1889 -  May 9, 1951) was a United States Thoroughbred horse racing national champion jockey who in 1913 captured both the National win and the National earnings titles. When his riding career was over, he went on to become a successful trainer and owner.

Merritt Buxton was the brother of Clarence Buxton, also a successful jockey and trainer. Merritt's son, Merritt A. Buxton, would follow in his father and uncle's footsteps and become a jockey and trainer.

References

1889 births
1951 deaths
American jockeys
American Champion jockeys
American horse trainers
American racehorse owners and breeders
People from East Aurora, New York